Arabi Island is one of the Saudi Arabian islands near Farsi Island in the Persian Gulf. The island measures ten hectares in area.

Along with Farsi, Arabi was once the subject of a territorial dispute between Iran and Saudi Arabia, but the two countries came to an agreement in the 1960s, in which Iran ceded sovereignty of Arabi to Saudi Arabia.

References

External links 

 Agreement concerning Sovereignty over the Islands of Farsi and Arabi

Islands of Saudi Arabia